John Francis Mullany (31 March 1873 – 4 November 1926) was an Australian politician. Born in Victoria, he moved to Western Australia in 1896. He was the member for Menzies in the Western Australian Legislative Assembly from 1911 to 1924, representing the Labor Party until 1917 and the National Labor Party thereafter.

References

Members of the Western Australian Legislative Assembly
Australian Labor Party members of the Parliament of Western Australia
National Labor Party members of the Parliament of Western Australia
1873 births
1926 deaths